Prilepy is a rural locality (a selo) in Kolbinskoye Rural Settlement, Repyovsky District, Voronezh Oblast, Russia. The population was 381 as of 2010. There are 6 streets.

Geography 
Prilepy is located 22 km east of Repyovka (the district's administrative centre) by road. Kolbino is the nearest rural locality.

References 

Rural localities in Repyovsky District